The 1862 Birthday Honours were appointments by Queen Victoria to various orders and honours to reward and highlight good works by citizens of the British Empire. The appointments were made to celebrate the official birthday of the Queen, and were published in The London Gazette on 23 May and 25 July 1862. 

The recipients of honours are displayed here as they were styled before their new honour, and arranged by honour, with classes (Knight, Knight Grand Cross, etc.) and then divisions (Military, Civil, etc.) as appropriate.

United Kingdom and British Empire

The Most Noble Order of the Garter

Knight of the Most Noble Order of the Garter (KG)
The Right Honourable Charles John, Earl Canning
The Right Honourable John, Earl Russell
The Most Noble Edward Adolphus, Duke of Somerset
The Right Honourable Anthony, Earl of Shaftesbury
The Right Honourable William Thomas Spencer, Earl Fitzwilliam

The Most Honourable Order of the Bath

Knight Commander of the Order of the Bath (KCB)

Civil Division
Colonial Service
William Stevenson  Governor and Commander-in-Chief in and over the Island of Mauritius and its dependencies 
Philip Edmond Wodehouse  Governor and Commander-in-Chief in and Over the Colony of the Cape of Good Hope and its Dependencies, and Her Majesty's High Commissioner for the settling and adjustment of the affairs of the territories adjacent or contiguous to the Eastern frontier of that colony
Charles Henry Darling, Captain-General and Governor-in-Chief in and over the Island of Jamaica and its dependencies 
Major-General Edward Macarthur  some time administering the Government of the Colony of Victoria

Companion of the Order of the Bath (CB)

Civil Division
Colonial Service
Francis Hincks, Governor and Commander in-Chief in and over the Colony of British Guiana
Charles John Bayley, Governor and Commander-in-Chief in and over the Bahama Islands and their dependencies
Ker Baillie-Hamilton, Governor and Commander-in-Chief in and over the Islands of Antigua, Montserrat, Barbuda, St. Christopher Nevis, Anguilla, the Virgin Islands, and Dominica
Arthur Edward Kennedy, some time Captain-General and Governor-in-Chief in and over the Colony of Sierra Leone and its dependencies, and subsequently Governor and Commander in Chief in and over the Colon of Western Australia
Sir Alfred Stephen  Chief Justice of the Supreme Court of the Colony of New South Wales 
Henry Black, Judge of the Vice-Admiralty Court of the Province of Canada

References

Birthday Honours
1862 awards
1862 in Australia
1862 in Canada
1862 in the United Kingdom